The Hunchback of Notre Dame (in French Notre-Dame de Paris) is a 1956 French-Italian  CinemaScope film version of Victor Hugo's 1831 novel, directed by Jean Delannoy and produced by Raymond Hakim and Robert Hakim. It stars American actor Anthony Quinn and Italian actress Gina Lollobrigida. The film is the first version of the novel to be made in color.

In the tradition of many sword and sandal spectacles, Quinn and Lollobrigida are the only two actors in the film who actually speak in English; the rest of the cast is made up of French actors who have had their voices dubbed into English. In the French version both Quinn and Lollobrigida speak French.

Anthony Quinn's portrayal of the hunchback Quasimodo is less disfigured than most other portrayals. Instead of having a huge hump and a hideously deformed face, he only has a small curve in his spine and a slightly deformed face.

The film is one of the few adaptations to use Victor Hugo's original ending; although Esmeralda is killed by a stray arrow rather than hanged. Esmeralda's last words were: "Life is wonderful" ("C'est beau, la vie"). A voiceover narration tells us at the end that several years afterward, an excavation group finds the skeletons of Quasimodo and Esmeralda intertwined in an embrace.

Plot
Quasimodo, the hunchback Anthony Quinn of Notre Dame Cathedral, falls in love with the gypsy Esmeralda Gina Lollobrigida. When Esmeralda is condemned as a witch by Claude Frollo Alain Cuny, the priest who longs for her, Quasimodo takes her into the Cathedral to save her. But in a misguided rescue attempt, the people come to free her and Quasimodo defends the Cathedral, but they burst through the front door just as soldiers arrive and shoot arrows. One of the arrows hits Esmeralda as the crowd graves her, and Quasimodo sees her die. When Frollo come up, Quasimodo throws him off the tower of the Cathedral, and then goes to find Esmeralda's body at a old dungeon site the dead are taken, where she is left, and Quasimodo mourns her.

Cast

Reception
The film was the biggest grosser in Paris in the 1956-1957 season with a gross of $603,000 on admissions of 1,064,061. It had the third most admissions in France for films released in 1956 with 5,687,222 admissions.

The film earned rentals of $2.25 million in the United States and Canada.

Comic book adaptation
 Dell Four Color #854 (July 1957)

References

External links

 
 
The Hunchback of Notre Dame at Trailers From Hell
 

1956 films
1956 horror films
1950s historical horror films
Italian historical films
French historical films
Films set in the 1480s
1950s French-language films
Films based on The Hunchback of Notre-Dame
Films directed by Jean Delannoy
Films set in Paris
Films set in religious buildings and structures
Films with screenplays by Ben Hecht
Films scored by Georges Auric
Films produced by Robert and Raymond Hakim
Films with screenplays by Jean Aurenche
Films with screenplays by Jacques Prévert
Films adapted into comics
Films about Romani people
1950s Italian films
1950s French films